Karalius is a surname. Notable people with the surname include:

Tony Karalius (1943–2019), English rugby league footballer 
Vince Karalius (1932–2008), English rugby league footballer and coach

Lithuanian-language surnames